Chrysallida canariensis is a species of sea snail, a marine gastropod mollusk in the family Pyramidellidae, the pyrams and their allies. The species is one of multiple species within the Chrysallida genus of gastropods.

Distribution
This marine species occurs in European waters.

References

External links
 
 To CLEMAM
 To Encyclopedia of Life

canariensis
Gastropods described in 1979
Molluscs of the Atlantic Ocean
Molluscs of the Canary Islands